Rhodothemis lieftincki, common name Red arrow, is a species of dragonfly in the family Libellulidae. 
The genus Rhodothemis is found in India, south-east Asia and Australia. Rhodothemis lieftincki is the only species of the genus seen in Australia. It inhabits coastal and inland streams, rivers, lagoons and ponds in an arc around northern Australia, from about Geraldton in the west to Sydney in the east.

Rhodothemis lieftincki is a medium-sized dragonfly with a wingspan about 60-85mm. The adult male is red in colour, and the female is a duller brown or orange.

Rhodothemis lieftincki has been assessed for the IUCN Red List as being of least concern.

Gallery

References

Libellulidae
Odonata of Australia
Odonata of Asia
Insects of Indonesia
Insects of Southeast Asia
Insects of India
Insects of New Guinea
Taxa named by Frederic Charles Fraser
Insects described in 1954